In 2014, the city of Memphis ranked eleventh in violent crimes for major cities around the U.S. In 2006, Memphis led the nation in number of violent crimes. In 2001, 2005, and 2007, Memphis ranked second most dangerous in the nation among cities with a population over 500,000.  It also ranked as most dangerous in 2002. There are approximately 182 gangs in Memphis, Tennessee with 8,400 gang members in the county.

Violent Crime Rates in Memphis, TN 

 * per 100,000 people

Violent Crime Rates in Cities 

 * per 100,000 people

Violent Crime Rates in States 
 * per 100,000 people

Crime dynamics 
In 2004 violent crime in Memphis reached a record low for over a decade, that trend subsequently reversed. In 2005, Memphis was ranked the 4th most dangerous city with a population of 500,000 or higher in the U.S. By 2006, Memphis held the top position of number of violent crimes in America. Recent statistics show a downward trend in crime in Memphis. Between 2006 and 2008, the crime rate fell by 16%. The first half of 2009 saw a reduction in serious crime of over 10% from the previous year.

Increase 

Crime in Memphis increased in 2005, and saw a dramatic rise in the first half of 2006. Nationally, cities follow similar trends, and crime numbers tend to be cyclical. Local experts and criminologists cite gang recruitment as one possible cause of the rise in crime in Memphis, and a reduction of 66% of federal funding to the Memphis Police Department. Between 2004 and 2008, the number of full-time officers in the Memphis Police Department fell by 23.2%.

In the first half of 2006, robbery of businesses increased 52.5%, robbery of individuals increased 28.5%, and homicide increased 18% over the same period of 2005. The Memphis Police Department has responded with the initiation of Operation Blue C.R.U.S.H. (Crime Reduction Using Statistical History), which targets crime hotspots and repeat offenders. 

Memphis ended 2005 with 154 murders (431 in whole TN), and 2006 ended with 160. 2007 saw 164 murders (397 in whole TN).

Decrease 

Violent crimes dropped from 12,939 in 2008 to 12,047 the next year. Robbery dropped from 4,788 in 2008 to 4,137 in 2009. Aggravated assault dropped 53,870 in 2008 to 47,158 in 2009 (FBI's UCR).

The Memphis Police Department's use of the FBI National Incident-Based Reporting System, which is a more detailed method of reporting crimes than what is used in many other major cities, has been cited as a reason for Memphis's frequent appearance on lists of most dangerous U.S. cities.

According to the Tennessee Bureau of Investigations, violent crime in Memphis decreased by 6.4% in 2014. Non-violent crimes decreased by 16.3%. Both of these were a much greater decrease than Tennessee's statewide averages of 2.4% and 2.5%, respectively.

Policing 

In 2008, the Memphis Police Department had 1,549 full-time sworn personnel (defined as those with general arrest powers). In 2013, after several gang related robberies at Tom Lee Park, the Memphis Police Department said that "they often feel powerless to control these out-of-control teens."

See also 
 Crime in Tennessee

References

Memphis, Tennessee
Crime in Tennessee
Memphis